Charles Herbert Cockrell (10 January 1939 – 4 October 2016) was a South African rugby union player who played three test matches for the South Africa national rugby union team.

Playing career
Cockrell made his provincial debut for Western Province in 1963 and played in 66 matches for the union before he retired in 1971.

He made his test debut for the Springboks during the 1969–70 Springbok tour of Britain and Ireland against Scotland on 6 December 1969 at Murrayfield in Edinburgh. Cockrell also played in the test matches against Ireland and Wales during the tour and in a further 7 tour matches for the Springboks.

Test history

Coaching career
After his playing career, Cockrell went on to coach the De Beers rugby club in Kimberley and Griquas during the 1975 Currie Cup competition. He was also assistant coach to Dawie Snyman for Western Province when they won the Currie Cup five times in a row between 1982–1986.

See also
List of South Africa national rugby union players – Springbok no. 441

References

1939 births
2016 deaths
South African rugby union players
South Africa international rugby union players
Rugby union hookers
Western Province (rugby union) players
Rugby union players from Cape Town